Waddell & Reed Financial, Inc. was an American asset management and financial planning company founded in 1937 in Kansas City, Missouri. It was a publicly traded company from 1998 to 2021, and briefly had its headquarters in Overland Park, Kansas, and was planning a move back to Downtown Kansas City before the company was sold. It operated asset management and distribution subsidiaries, including Ivy Investment Management Company and Waddell & Reed Investment Management Company.

The company distributed products through three primary channels:

 Advisors channel (a network of personal financial advisors around the country);
 Wholesale channel (unaffiliated broker/dealers, registered investment advisors and retirement platforms); and the
 Institutional channel (pension plans, defined benefit plans and endowments).

History
The company traces its history to September 3, 1937, when it was founded by Chauncey Waddell and Cameron Reed. The company was one of the first to sell funds following the Investment Company Act of 1940. Two of its funds—United Income Fund and United Accumulative Fund—were among the first mutual funds in the United States. Its first offices were in department stores. Continental Investment Corporation of Boston bought Waddell & Reed for $82.5 million in 1969. Liberty National Insurance Holding Company, later renamed Torchmark Corporation acquired it for $160 million in 1981. Torchmark spun it off in 1998 in a deal where for 10 Torchmark shares held, Torchmark shareholders received 3 shares of Waddell & Reed. In the 2000s, the company was put in the spotlight due to being a major factor in the 2010 "Flash Crash", when a bug in the companies' algorithm coupled with significant competing high frequency traders combined to create a massive crash in the price of S&P500 E-mini futures. In February 2016, Waddell & Reed announced the purchase of at least 8.2% of the Spanish company Abengoa, which was in serious financial trouble. 

In 2021, the company was purchased by the asset management division of Macquarie Group, becoming a wholly-owned subsidiary in the process. Waddell & Reed's wealth management business was acquired by LPL Financial in April 2021.

References

External links
 Home page

American companies established in 1937
Financial services companies established in 1937
Investment management companies of the United States
Companies based in Overland Park, Kansas
Corporate spin-offs
2021 mergers and acquisitions